Botanical gardens in Bulgaria sometimes have collections consisting entirely of native and endemic species; most have a collection that include plants from around the world. There are botanical gardens and arboreta in all states and territories of Bulgaria, most are administered by local governments, some are privately owned.

 Sofia University Botanical garden, Balchik – Balchik
 Sofia University Botanical garden, Varna – Varna
 Sofia University Botanical garden, Sofia – Sofia
 Bulgarian Academy of Sciences Botanical garden – Sofia
 University of Forestry Botanical garden – Sofia

References 

Bulgaria
Botanical gardens